In the Morning I'll be Gone is a 2014 novel by Belfast born novelist Adrian McKinty which won the 2014 Ned Kelly Award for Best Novel.  It is the third in the author's Sean Duffy series, following The Cold Cold Ground and I Hear the Sirens in the Street.

Plot summary

In Belfast, September 1983, in the middle of The Troubles, Sergeant Sean Duffy, one of the few Catholics in the Royal Ulster Constabulary (RUC), is drummed out of the RUC on trumped up charges.  At the same time, Dermot McCann, an IRA master bomber and ex-schoolmate of Duffy's escapes from the Maze prison and becomes a prime target for British Intelligence.  MI5 drags Duffy out of his drunken retirement to track down McCann.  The novel follows Duffy's attempts to solve a locked-room murder in order to obtain inside information on McCann's whereabouts, which finally leads to the assassination attempt on British Prime Minister Margaret Thatcher in Brighton.

Notes

 Epitaph: "My friend you must understand that time forks perpetually into countless futures. And in at least one of them I have become your enemy." Jorge Luis Borges, The Garden of Forking Paths (1941)

Reviews

 The Boston Globe
 Kirkus Reviews
 Publishers Weekly
 Booklover Book Reviews

Awards and nominations

 2014 winner Ned Kelly Awards for Crime Writing — Best Novel

References 

2014 Australian novels
Australian crime novels
Ned Kelly Award-winning works
Allen & Unwin books